Araullo University,  also referred to by its acronym "AU " or simply "Araullo", is a private, non-sectarian secondary and higher education institution in Cabanatuan, Nueva Ecija, Philippines. It was established in 1950. The university offers a wide range of secondary, undergraduate and graduate programs in its two campuses.

With its acquisition of the University in 2004, Philippine conglomerate PHINMA established the PHINMA Education Network. Together with Cagayan de Oro College (Cagayan de Oro), University of Iloilo (Iloilo City), the University of Pangasinan (Dagupan), Southwestern University (Cebu City), Saint Jude College (Manila) and Republican College (Quezon City), Araullo University forms part of a more than 74,000-strong student community.

Due to its reputation as a leading higher educational institution in the local community, PHINMA AU has been named as one of the four 'Knowledge Eagle Universities of Nueva Ecija.'

History
In response to the increasing demand for legal education in Nueva Ecija, the Esteban and Castelo families (some of whom were judges and attorneys) established Araullo Law School, a nonsectarian, co-educational and private law school. It was named after Manuel Araullo, a judge in Nueva Ecija, Pampanga, and Tarlac before becoming the third Chief Justice of the Philippines. His fair judgments earned him the title “The Just Judge.”

Araullo Law School had an initial batch of 27 students. Classes were first held in the upper floor of the Cabanatuan Puericulture Center. However, as enrollment increased, the law school moved in 1951 to its second campus, a leased premise along M. H. del Pilar Street. In 1963, the League of Provincial Governors proclaimed the law school as the “most outstanding institution in Central Luzon.”

In 1969, the school was transferred to a five (5)-hectare property in Barangay Bitas where it still stands today. Araullo Law School then became a college, known as Araullo Lyceum. It offered diverse courses and improved its facilities. This led the Department of Education, Culture and Sports to grant the institution the university status in 1983, giving it a good reason to rename itself as Araullo University.

On April 20, 2004, Araullo University became part of the PHINMA Education Network (PEN), an educational institution that aims to provide quality yet affordable education. Through PHINMA, Araullo University strengthened its academic offerings and employed non-traditional approaches to learning.

Considering the development of the community it serves, PHINMA AU is guided by its mission of developing Filipino professionals through the endowment of knowledge and skills, as well as, character and spiritual formation.

PHINMA AU has been ranked number 14 nationwide in the list of schools with 50 or more examinees for Accountants. It produced topnotchers in Criminology Licensure Examination in August 2010 and in April 2016. Likewise, it also produced topnotchers in the Licensure Examination for Teachers (LET) in April 2013.

In 2014, PHINMA AU South was opened to cater to students from the southern part of Nueva Ecija. It offers bachelor's degrees in Hotel & Restaurant Management, Tourism Management, Pharmacy, Business Administration major in Banking and Microfinance.

From an enrollment level of only 5,753 students in 2004, PHINMA AU now boasts of 10,200 students in 2017 with the biggest batch of Senior High School students in the whole province of Nueva Ecija.

Academics
Undergraduate Programs

College of Allied Health Sciences

 Bachelor of Science in Nursing*
 Bachelor of Science in Pharmacy*

College of Education and Liberal Arts Bachelor of Elementary Education*
 Bachelor of Secondary Education*
 (Major in English, Mathematics, and Biological Science) Bachelor of Arts in Political Science

College of Criminal Justice Education

 Bachelor of Science in Criminology*

College of Information Technology and Engineering

 Bachelor of Science in Civil Engineering*
 Bachelor of Science in Information Technology

College of Management and Accountancy

 Bachelor of Science in Accountancy*
 Bachelor of Science in Accounting Information Systems
 Bachelor of Science in Business Administration
 (Major in Banking & Microfinance, Human Resource Management, and Marketing Management)''
 Bachelor of Science in Entrepreneurship
 Bachelor of Science in Hospitality Management
 Bachelor of Science in Tourism Management

*Programs with corresponding licensure examinations administered by the Philippine Professional Regulation CommissionGraduate ProgramsDoctor of Philosophy (Ph.D.) Educational Management
 Filipino
 Psychology and Guidance
 Public Management
 Science EducationMaster of Arts (MA) Educational Management
 English
 Filipino
 Guidance and Counseling
 Mathematics
 Physical Education
 Psychology
 Public Management
 Science EducationMaster of Science in Business Administration (MSBA)Secondary ProgramsJunior High SchoolSenior High SchoolAcademic Track

 Accountancy, Business and Management Strand (ABM)
 ABM with focus on Hospitality and Tourism Management
 General Academic Strand (GAS)
 GAS with focus on Criminology
 GAS with focus on Education
 GAS with focus on Information Technology
 Humanities and Social Sciences Strand (HUMSS)
 Science, Technology, Engineering and Mathematics Strand (STEM)
 STEM with focus on Health

Technical, Vocational, and Livelihood (TVL) Track

 Home Economics with focus on Hospitality Management
 Home Economics with focus on Tourism Management
 Information and Communications Technology (ICT) with focus on Computer Programming

Sister schoolsCagayan de Oro College, Cagayan de Oro, PhilippinesUniversity of Iloilo, Iloilo City, PhilippinesUniversity of Pangasinan, Dagupan, PhilippinesSouthwestern University''', Cebu City, Philippines

References

External links

 
 Official Website of PHINMA Education
 Official Website of Araullo University

Universities and colleges in Nueva Ecija
Education in Cabanatuan
Educational institutions established in 1950
1950 establishments in the Philippines